White Lead (Painting) Convention, 1921 is  an International Labour Organization Convention established in 1921 to advance the prohibition of using white lead in paint.

As of 2017 many leading global nations, including the United States, the United Kingdom, Germany, Japan, China and India remain outside the organization.

Ratifications
As of 2013, the convention has been ratified by 63 states:

References

External links 
Text.
Ratifications.

Health treaties
White
Occupational safety and health treaties
Treaties concluded in 1921
Treaties entered into force in 1923
Lead
Treaties of the Kingdom of Afghanistan
Treaties of Algeria
Treaties of Argentina
Treaties of the First Austrian Republic
Treaties of Azerbaijan
Treaties of Belgium
Treaties of the Republic of Dahomey
Treaties of Bosnia and Herzegovina
Treaties of Bulgaria
Treaties of Burkina Faso
Treaties of the Kingdom of Cambodia (1953–1970)
Treaties of Cameroon
Treaties of the Central African Republic
Treaties of Chad
Treaties of Chile
Treaties of Colombia
Treaties of the Comoros
Treaties of the Republic of the Congo
Treaties of Ivory Coast
Treaties of Croatia
Treaties of Cuba
Treaties of Czechoslovakia
Treaties of the Czech Republic
Treaties of Djibouti
Treaties of Estonia
Treaties of Finland
Treaties of the French Third Republic
Treaties of Gabon
Treaties of the Kingdom of Greece
Treaties of Guatemala
Treaties of Guinea
Treaties of the Hungarian People's Republic
Treaties of the Iraqi Republic (1958–1968)
Treaties of Italy
Treaties of the Kingdom of Laos
Treaties of Latvia
Treaties of Madagascar
Treaties of Luxembourg
Treaties of Mali
Treaties of Malta
Treaties of Mauritania
Treaties of Mexico
Treaties of Morocco
Treaties of the Netherlands
Treaties of Nicaragua
Treaties of Niger
Treaties of Norway
Treaties of Panama
Treaties of the Second Polish Republic
Treaties of the Kingdom of Romania
Treaties of the Soviet Union
Treaties of Senegal
Treaties of Serbia and Montenegro
Treaties of Slovakia
Treaties of Slovenia
Treaties of Spain under the Restoration
Treaties of Suriname
Treaties of Sweden
Treaties of North Macedonia
Treaties of Togo
Treaties of Tunisia
Treaties of Uruguay
Treaties of Venezuela
Treaties of Montenegro
Treaties extended to French Algeria
Treaties extended to the French Southern and Antarctic Lands
Treaties extended to Clipperton Island
Treaties extended to French Comoros
Treaties extended to French Somaliland
Treaties extended to French Guiana
Treaties extended to French Polynesia
Treaties extended to Guadeloupe
Treaties extended to Martinique
Treaties extended to Mayotte
Treaties extended to New Caledonia
Treaties extended to Réunion
Treaties extended to Saint Pierre and Miquelon
Treaties extended to Wallis and Futuna
Treaties extended to Surinam (Dutch colony)
Chemical safety
1921 in labor relations